

Season 
The chairman Carlo Masseroni appointed manager Alfredo Foni, who had coached the national team from 1936 to 1942. He set up a revolution, later known as catenaccio referring to the use of play in defence. The goalkeeper Giorgio Ghezzi was covered by Blason, Giacomazzi, Nesti, Giovannini and Neri. Armano became the first winger of Italian football while, in attacking zone, Skoglund acted as a playmaker behind Lorenzi and Nyers, both strikers.

Inter conceded few goals and at mid-league, the side had 30 points in 17 games. Inter also did not suffer a loss for 19 consecutive weeks. Despite criticized, sometimes, for his defensive trend, Foni celebrated - with 3 games to spare - the win of the Scudetto, for the first time in 13 years since 1940. Having the best defence of the season, Inter resulted to have conceded only 24 goals. Inter won the title collecting 47 points.

Squad 
Source:

The roles of players are in brackets.

  Gino Armano (winger)
  Ivano Blason (full back)
  Sergio Brighenti (centre forward)
  Pietro Broccini (midfielder)
  Sebastiano Buzzin (midfielder)
  Osvaldo Fattori (midfielder)
  Giorgio Ghezzi (goalkeeper)
  Giovanni Giacomazzi (centre back)
  Attilio Giovannini (half back)
  Lino Grava (full back)
  Benito Lorenzi (centre forward)
  Bruno Mazza (midfielder)
  Lido Mazzoni (winger)
  Sergio Morin (midfielder)
  Maino Neri (midfielder)
  Fulvio Nesti (midfielder)
  István Nyers (centre forward)
  Bruno Padulazzi (full back)
  Lennart Skoglund (playmaker)

Competitions

Serie A

League table

Matches

Statistics

Squad statistics

2 points were awarded for every win, so Inter collected 47 points instead 66.

Source:

Players statistics

References

See also 
 Inter Milan

Inter Milan seasons
Internazionale
Italian football championship-winning seasons